The Classic is a greyhound racing competition held at Sunderland Greyhound Stadium. It was inaugurated in 2007 and initially formed part of a festival of racing which also included the William Hill Grand Prix. In 2019 the Classic was renamed, dropping the sponsor's name William Hill. The event was not run in 2020 but returned during 2021.

The prize money offered was a substantial first prize of £25,000, which meant that it was considered a major competition in United Kingdom greyhound racing at the time. However, it dropped to just £6,500 before increasing to £10,000 in 2022, it attracts entries predominantly from the North of England.

Past winners

Distances & Venue 
 2007–2022 (Sunderland 450 metres)

Sponsors
 2007–2018 (William Hill)
 2019–2019 (NSL)
 2021–2022 (ARC)

References

Greyhound racing competitions in the United Kingdom
Sport in the City of Sunderland
Recurring sporting events established in 2007